The Theban Tomb TT62 is located in Sheikh Abd el-Qurna. It forms part of the Theban Necropolis, situated on the west bank of the Nile opposite to Luxor.

The tomb belongs to an 18th Dynasty ancient Egyptian named Amenemwaskhet, who was Overseer of the Cabinet during the reign of Thutmosis III.

See also
 List of Theban tombs

References

Buildings and structures completed in the 13th century BC
Theban tombs